Fabiano Leismann (born 18 November 1991), sometimes known as just Fabiano, is a Brazilian professional footballer who plays for Greek Super League club Aris. A versatile player, he can equally play as either a central defender or as a right back.

Career

Aris 
On 15 July 2021, Greek Super League club Aris announced the signing of Fabiano Leismann, who signed a three-year contract with the club after successfully passing all the procedural physical and medical examinations he was subjected to.

Not long after the signing of the player, the club included Fabiano Leismann in the list for their first two European matches for the 2021–22 UEFA Europa Conference League, starting from 22 July 2021.

On 19 July 2021, it was made known that the Turkish Football Federation is refusing to send the blue card of the player, reportedly as retaliation for the incident with Galatasaray some days earlier, with the club of Aris asking an intervention by FIFA, because the issue must be solved before the match on Thursday (22 July 2021) so Fabiano to be eligible to play in that match. On the same day, it was also reported FIFA had intervened and asked the Turkish Football Federation to comply and send the blue card.

Personal life 
Fabiano Leismann's hometown São João do Oeste's inhabitants are mostly of German descent. His surname ("Leissman") is of German descent, and speaks the language fluently.

Honours
Individual
Super League Greece Player of the Month: April 2022

References

External links 
 Fabiano Leismann's profile at ArisFC.com.gr
 

1991 births
Living people
Sportspeople from Santa Catarina (state)
Brazilian footballers
Brazilian people of German descent
Association football defenders
Campeonato Brasileiro Série A players
Campeonato Brasileiro Série B players
Campeonato Brasileiro Série C players
Associação Chapecoense de Futebol players
Cruzeiro Esporte Clube players
Sociedade Esportiva Palmeiras players
Denizlispor footballers
Aris Thessaloniki F.C. players
Super League Greece players
Süper Lig players
Primeira Liga players
Brazilian expatriate footballers
Expatriate footballers in Greece
Expatriate footballers in Turkey
Expatriate footballers in Portugal
Brazilian expatriate sportspeople
Brazilian expatriate sportspeople in Portugal
Brazilian expatriate sportspeople in Turkey
Brazilian expatriate sportspeople in Greece